Vanillyl alcohol is derived from vanillin.  It is used to flavor food.

See also
 Anisyl alcohol
 Guaiacol

References

Primary alcohols
Phenols
Phenol ethers